LaRon Dendy (born December 18, 1988) is an American basketball player for Kharkivski Sokoly. Dendy was an All-American college player at Middle Tennessee State University before beginning his professional career in 2012.

Career
Dendy, a  power forward and center from Greenville, South Carolina, originally committed to Clemson. He instead went to Indian Hills Community College and played two years for the NJCAA school.  He then went to Iowa State for the 2009–10 season, where he averaged 7.2 points and 3.6 rebounds per game in a reserve role.  Following the season, Dendy announced plans to transfer.

With one year of college eligibility left, Dendy landed at Middle Tennessee.  He had a strong year, averaging 14.6 points and 7.1 rebounds per game and leading the Blue Raiders to the Sun Belt Conference regular season title.  He was rewarded with the Sun Belt Conference Men's Basketball Player of the Year and an Associated Press honorable mention All-American designation.

Following the close of his college career, Dendy went undrafted in the 2012 NBA draft.  After playing in the Washington Wizards' Summer League team, he signed with Kolossos Rodou of the Greek Basket League.  He finished the season with Darüşşafaka of the Turkish Basketball League.

On April 24, 2017, Dendy signed with Hapoel Tel Aviv. On December 28, 2018, Dendy signed with Donar of the Dutch Basketball League. He played there for one and a half months and had to leave the team in February 2019.

The Basketball Tournament
LaRon Dendy played for Team Fancy in the 2018 edition of The Basketball Tournament. In 2 games, he averaged 5 points, 4 rebounds, and shot 43 percent from the field. Team Fancy reached the second round before falling to Boeheim's Army.

References

External links
LNB Pro B profile
Greek Basket League stats
Real GM profile
Middle Tennessee Blue Raiders bio

1988 births
Living people
American expatriate basketball people in France
American expatriate basketball people in Greece
American expatriate basketball people in Lithuania
American expatriate basketball people in the Netherlands
American expatriate basketball people in Turkey
American expatriate basketball people in Ukraine
American men's basketball players
Basketball players from South Carolina
BC Juventus players
BC Zaporizhya players
Centers (basketball)
Darüşşafaka Basketbol players
Donar (basketball club) players
Fos Provence Basket players
Hapoel Tel Aviv B.C. players
Indian Hills Warriors basketball players
Iowa State Cyclones men's basketball players
Kolossos Rodou B.C. players
Middle Tennessee Blue Raiders men's basketball players
BC Kharkivski Sokoly players
Power forwards (basketball)
Sportspeople from Greenville, South Carolina